Angarei is one of 22 islands in the Aitutaki atoll of the Cook Islands. It is located on the northeastern perimeter of Aitutaki Lagoon to the north of the larger island of Ee, three kilometres to the east of the main island of Aitutaki. The island is 480m long by 400m wide.

References

Islands of Aitutaki